Final table of the 2000-2001 season of the French Championship of Rugby League.

Final table

Rugby league competitions in France
French Championship season
French Championship season